SPOTV is a South Korean pay television network, which features sports programming and some sports-related talk shows. Founded in 2010, the network is the fourth non-'free-to-air' broadcaster in South Korea alongside KBS N Sports, MBC Sports+ and SBS Sports (the latter two of which were previously founded under a joint venture with ESPN International in the early 2000s and 2010s respectively).

On December 1, 2015, The Daily Dot reported that SPOTV may be acquiring the rights to broadcast League of Legends Champions Korea from OnGameNet (now called as OGN) for its sister channel SPOTV Games, which mostly aired eSports tournaments, before it was rebranded as STATV in March 2020, which focus on athletes and celebrities. They also got SPOTV ON, which aired sports that didn't usually air on SPOTV & SPOTV2, along with SPOTV NOW, a sports-dedicated streaming service similar to DAZN and ESPN+. They also got SPOTV Golf & Health, for golf and eellness, as the channel previously founded as its additional in-house channel SPOTV+.

In May 2020, the U.S. television network ESPN began showing Korea Baseball Organization games with video feed from SPOTV following the lack of live sports programming in the United States due to the pandemic.

On September 14, 2021, Eclat Entertainment announced that they will bring SPOTV to 13 Southeast Asian countries. SPOTV will take over the role of recently closed Fox Sports Asia in those countries, awhile to promoting other sporting events which has been aired in the respective Asian countries. SPOTV were also responsible to covering the remaining 2021 MotoGP World Championship where Fox Sports abruptly concluding the coverage following the shutdown announcement.

Broadcasting rights

South Korea

Football 

 England: Premier League (until 2025), FA Cup, FA Community Shield, Premier League Asia Trophy
 Italy: Serie A, Coppa Italia, Supercoppa Italiana
 Spain: La Liga (until 2022/23), Supercopa de España
 Germany: DFB-Pokal (2022 final)
 UEFA: UEFA Champions League, UEFA Europa League, UEFA Europa Conference League (from 2021-22), UEFA Nations League, UEFA Super Cup, UEFA European Qualifiers
 EAFF: EAFF E-1 Football Championship & EAFF E-1 Football Championship (women) (from 2017)
 Other: 
 Football at the 2019 Southeast Asian Games – Men's tournament
 Finalissima 2022

Baseball 

 KBO League
 Major League Baseball

Basketball 

 NBA
 NCAA Division I men's basketball tournament
 KBL
 WKBL

Tennis 

 ATP
 WTA
 Wimbledon (from 2022)
 U.S. Open (from 2022)

Motorsports 
 Asia Road Racing Championship
 Formula E
 MotoGP
 Moto2
 Moto3
 MotoE
 Superbike World Championship

Volleyball 

 CVL

Golf 

 Japan Golf Tour Organization
 Ladies European Tour
 Ryder Cup
 LIV Golf
 Icon Series

Rugby 

 World Rugby Sevens Series

Southeast Asia & Hong Kong (except Vietnam)

Football 
 J-League
 Globe Soccer Awards

Motorsports 
 MotoGP
 Moto2
 Moto3
 MotoE
 Superbike World Championship
 Formula E
 Supercars Championship
 Extreme E
 W Series
 Super GT

Badminton (excluding Malaysia) 
 BWF World Tour
 Thomas Cup
 Uber Cup
 Sudirman Cup
 BWF World Tour Finals
 BWF World Championships

Billiards (excluding Philippines) 
Derby City Classic Billiards Tournament
World 10-ball Championship
Women's World 10-ball Championship

Tennis 

 Wimbledon
 U.S. Open
 Mubadala World Tennis Championship
 Davis Cup

Baseball 

 KBO League

Basketball 

 KBL

Volleyball 
 CVL
 Japanese V-League
 Korean V-League

Table Tennis 

 World Table Tennis

Golf 

 The Masters
 U.S. Open
 U.S. Senior Open
 The Open Championship
 Senior Open Championship
 Women's British Open
 Asian Tour
 LIV Golf
 Icon Series

Triathlon 

 PTO Tour

Rugby 

 World Rugby Sevens Series

Figure Skating 

 ISU Grand Prix of Figure Skating

Squash 

 Canary Wharf Squash Classic

Horse racing 

 Saudi Cup

Japan

Football 
 England (until 2025): Premier League, Scottish Professional Football League

Baseball 

 Major League Baseball

Notes

References

External links 

2010 establishments in South Korea
Companies based in Seoul
Television networks in South Korea
Television channels and stations established in 2010
Esports television